Pavitra Hrudayalu is a 1971 Indian Telugu-language drama film directed by A. C. Tirulokchandar. It stars N. T. Rama Rao, Jamuna and Chandrakala with music composed by T. Chalapathi Rao. The film is produced by C. S. Raju under the Sri Vijaya Venkateswara Films banner.

Plot
Zamindar Bhujanga Rao has two grandsons, Narendra Babu and Ravindra Babu. Seshagiri, their maternal uncle, a cruel person who wants to grab the property makes Bhujanga Rao throw out Narendra by habituating him to all sorts of vices, whereas Ravindra becomes a famous singer.

Meanwhile, Sivayya, who works for Bhujanga Rao has two daughters Suseela and Vijaya. Sivayya is a spoiled brat, so, his elder daughter Suseela runs the house and their house owner Paanakaalu has an evil eye on her. Once, he tries to molest her, and knowing it, Sivayya knocks on Paanakalu with the knife and accused him. Here everyone blames Suseela and she attempts suicide when Narendra rescues her.

Meanwhile, Seshagiri's ploy creates Ravindra as a debauched person before Bhujanga Rao. So, he too leaves the house when Seshagiri plans to eliminate him, but fortunately, he is saved by Vijaya. Now Paanakaalu troubles Vijaya to marry him for the clearance of their debts when Ravindra comes to their protection and decides to marry Vijaya. Simultaneously, Narendra is relieved from his vices in virtue of Suseela and they fall in love.

Once, Seshagiri spots an identical person to Bhujanga Rao, so, he kills him and keeps the new guy in his place, by hiding Bhujanga Rao for their hierarchical secret treasure. He also makes Ravindra arrive at the spot by a fake call, throws the blame on him, and provokes him against Narendra. Angered, Ravindra rushes toward Narendra, but after reaching him, he understands the virtue of his brother through Suseela.

Then, Ravindra realizes the real culprit is Seshagiri and decides to reveal his shade, before leaving he asks Narendra to safeguard Vijaya and her mother Annapurnamma (Santha Kumari). So, Narendra brings them home where they are surprised to see Suseela alive and all of them are filled with joy. At last, Ravindra, in various forms of disguise traps Seshagiri and saves his grandfather. Finally, the movie ends on a happy note with the marriages of Narendra to Suseela and Ravindra to Vijaya.

Cast

N. T. Rama Rao as Ravindra Babu
Jamuna as Suseela
Chandrakala as Vijaya
Gummadi as Nagendra Babu
V. Nagayya as Zamindar Bhujanga Rao 
Santha Kumari as Annapurnamma 
Satyanarayana as Seshagiri 
Dhulipala as Sivayya
Mikkilineni as Police Officer 
Rajanala 
Allu Ramalingaiah as Paanakaalu 
Raja Babu as Bobby 
Sandhya Rani as Rani
Thyagaraju as Subbigadu
Perumaalu as Ramayya
K. V. Chalam
Padma Khanna

Music 
Music was composed by T. Chalapathi Rao. Lyrics were written by C. Narayana Reddy.

References

External links
 

1970s Telugu-language films
1971 drama films
Films directed by A. C. Tirulokchandar
Films scored by T. Chalapathi Rao
Indian drama films